Amangeldy (also spelled Amangeldi) is a given name of Central Asian origin. Notable people with the name include:

Amangeldy Aytaly (1939–2022), Kazakh academic and politician
Amangeldy Hydyr (born 1951), Turkmenistani painter
Amangeldy Muraliyev (born 1947), Kyrgyz politician
Amangeldy Shabdarbayev (born 1950), Kazakh intelligence officer
Amangeldi Taspihov (born 1959), Kazakh politician, businessman, and trade unionist
Amangeldy Gumirovich Tuleyev (born 1944), Russian statesman

See also
Amangeldi, a village in Kostanay Region, Kazakhstan